Filippo Tiscione (born 9 December 1985) is an Italian football player who plays for ACD Città di Sant'Agata.

Club career
Filippo made his Serie C debut for Racing Fondi on 28 August 2016 in a game against Reggina.

On 16 December 2018, he signed with Siracusa. After a short stint with Casarano, Tiscione joined Eccellenza club ACD Città di Sant'Agata.

References

External links
 

1985 births
Footballers from Palermo
Living people
Italian footballers
Association football forwards
A.S. Cosenza Calcio players
U.S. Vibonese Calcio players
Trapani Calcio players
A.S.G. Nocerina players
A.C. Savoia 1908 players
S.S. Akragas Città dei Templi players
S.S. Racing Club Fondi players
Ternana Calcio players
Matera Calcio players
Latina Calcio 1932 players
Siracusa Calcio players
Serie B players
Serie C players
Serie D players
U.S. Agropoli 1921 players